Tough Guys, Easy Girls is a 1927 German silent comedy film directed by Carl Boese and starring Lissy Arna, Gustav Fröhlich and Eugen Burg.

The film's sets were designed by the art director Max Knaake.

Cast
Lissy Arna as Adele, ein leichtes Mädchen
Gustav Fröhlich as Martin Overbeck jun.
Eugen Burg as Martin Overbeck sen.
Gottfried Hagedorn as Christoph
Renate Brausewetter as Tina Schaffner
Bernd Aldor as Dr. Hans Brunner
Victor Horwitz as Aloys Mausberger
Karl Falkenberg as Peter Spieß, Maurer
Else Reval as Seine Frau Marie
Fritz Kampers as Der lange Max, Auflader
Wolfgang Zilzer as Hoppler
Trude Lehmann as Frau Hoppler
Hilde Maroff as Bertha
Walter Karel as Der Kleiderhändler
Harry Grunwald as Winkelhuber
Bruno Hoenscherle as Körner

References

External links

Films of the Weimar Republic
Films directed by Carl Boese
German silent feature films
National Film films
German black-and-white films
1927 comedy films
German comedy films
Silent comedy films
1920s German films